The People of the Wind is also the title of a science fiction novel by Poul Anderson

People of the Wind is a 1976 American documentary film about the Bakhtiari people, produced by Anthony Howarth and David Koff. It was nominated for an Academy Award for Best Documentary Feature and also for a Golden Globe.

References

External links

People of the Wind at Milestone Films

1976 films
1976 documentary films
American documentary films
Anthropology documentary films
Documentary films about Iran
1970s English-language films
1970s American films